The January 1910 United Kingdom general election in Ireland was held with ninety-nine of the seats in single-member districts using the first-past-the-post electoral system, and the constituencies of Cork City and Dublin University were two-member districts using block voting.

The election had been called as H. H. Asquith sought a mandate for the People's Budget which had been presented by Chancellor of the Exchequer David Lloyd George, but had been rejected by the House of Lords. In the election as a whole, the Liberal Party lost its majority, and was dependent on the Irish Parliamentary Party, the breakaway All-for-Ireland League, and the Labour Party.

A second election was held in December, with broadly similar results.

Results

See also
 History of Ireland (1801–1923)

References

General elections in Ireland to the Parliament of the United Kingdom
Ireland
1910 elections in Ireland